Couch (1964) is a feature-length underground film directed by Andy Warhol, and starring Gerard Malanga, Piero Heliczer, Naomi Levine, Gregory Corso, Allen Ginsberg, John Palmer, Baby Jane Holzer, Ivy Nicholson, Amy Taubin, Ondine, Peter Orlovsky, Jack Kerouac, Taylor Mead, Kate Heliczer, Rufus Collins, Joseph LeSeuer, Binghamton Birdie, Mark Lancaster, Gloria Wood, and Billy Name.

Plot
An "entirely pornographic" series of sexual encounters on the old red couch at The Factory, with all permutations and orientations.

See also
List of American films of 1964
Andy Warhol filmography

References

External links
Couch at IMDB
Couch at WarholStars

1964 films
Films directed by Andy Warhol
1960s English-language films
1960s American films